Attilio Amalteo (1545–1633) was a Roman Catholic prelate who served as Apostolic Nuncio to Germany (1606–1610) and Titular Archbishop of Athenae (1606–1633).

Biography
Attilio Amalteo was born in 1545.
On 14 August 1606, he was appointed during the papacy of Pope Paul V as Titular Archbishop of Athenae.
On 1 September 1606, he was appointed during the papacy of Pope Paul V as Apostolic Nuncio to Germany.
He served as Apostolic Nuncio to Germany until his resignation on 26 April 1610. 
He died on 25 May 1633.

Episcopal succession

References 

17th-century Roman Catholic titular bishops
Bishops appointed by Pope Paul V
1545 births
1633 deaths
Apostolic Nuncios to Germany